Stefania Sansonna (born 1 November 1982 Canosa di Puglia) is an Italian volleyball player. She plays for Italy women's national volleyball team. She participated in the 2015 Women's European Volleyball Championship.

She plays libero for AGIL Volleyball.

Life 
Stefania Sansonna's volleyball career began in 1994 in POL Popular Canosa, in Serie D, where she remained until 1997.
In the 1997–98 season, she made her debut in professional volleyball, hired by the Center Ester Volleyball of Naples, A1 Series.

After a period in Faenza in Serie B2, from the 1998–99 season and for six consecutive years, she played in the Championship Series B1, first for the Municipal Police Volley team for three seasons, then in Riviera Volleyball team for a season, and finally in Aces Manzoni Volleyball Brindisi for two seasons.

In the 2005–06 season, she made her debut in professional volleyball A2 series with the ' Effe Sport Isernia . 
In the 2006–07 season. she was hired by Florens Volley Castellana Grotte. 
From the 2008–09 season, she played regularly at Castellana Grotte in the A1 Series.

In the 2010–11 season, she was hired by Asystel of Novara; at the end of the 2011–12 season, after the release of the Piedmontese team from the play-off championship, she was engaged by the team Azeri of Igtisadchi Baku, to replace Yūko Sano.

In the 2012–13 season back in Italy, she played for River Volley Piacenza for two years, with whom he won two Italian Cups, two league titles and one Italian Super Cup.
In 2014, she got the first call-up to the National team. 
In the 2014–15 season she was back in Novara, this time with the AGIL Volley, which won the Italian Cup 2014-15 and the 2016-17 Scudetto .

References

External links 
 
 http://www.agilvolley.com/giocatrici.asp?id=203&iframe=true&width=750&height=500
 Stefania Sansonna Pallavoliamo.it, May 5, 2013

1982 births
Living people
Italian women's volleyball players
Serie A1 (women's volleyball) players